Vinbarbital is a hypnotic drug which is a barbiturate derivative. It was developed by Sharp and Dohme in 1939.

References 

Barbiturates
Sedatives
GABAA receptor positive allosteric modulators
Alkene derivatives